The brown wood rail (Aramides wolfi) is a Vulnerable species of bird in the subfamily Rallinae of the rail, crake, and coot family Rallidae. It is found in Colombia and Ecuador.

Taxonomy and systematics

The brown wood rail is monotypic.

Description

The sexes are alike. Adults have a yellow-green bill, a red eye, and pink legs and feet. Their head is ashy gray with a yellow spot on the forehead and a pale throat. Their tail, flanks, and belly are black and the rest of their body is chestnut to warm brown. Immatures and juveniles have not been described.

The brown wood rail's specific epithet commemorates the German naturalist Theodor Wolf.

Distribution and habitat

The brown wood rail is patchily distributed in western Colombia and western Ecuador. A single 1977 report from Peru was retracted in 2011 and the South American Classification Committee of the American Ornithological Society does not recognize it. It inhabits a variety of wet and dry landscapes including mangroves, freshwater marsh, swampy woodland, river bottoms, and mature and secondary forest.

Behavior

Movement

The brown wood rail appears to be a year-round resident throughout its range.

Feeding

Nothing is known about the brown wood rail's foraging methods or diet.

Breeding

The brown wood rail's breeding season in Ecuador spans at least February to April. Nests there were bulk open cups made of large dead leaves and bits of vine. The clutch size was two to four eggs and the incubation period was at least 19 days.

Vocalization

One call of the brown wood rail is a repeated "kui-co-mui".

Status

The IUCN originally assessed the brown wood rail as Threatened but since 1994 has classed it as Vulnerable. It is known from only a small number of locations. Its estimated population of 1000 to 2500 mature individuals is believed to be decreasing due to "rapid rates of habitat destruction". "There is an urgent need for further investigation of its status and natural history."

References

External links
Species Factsheet from Birdlife International

brown wood rail
Birds of the Tumbes-Chocó-Magdalena
brown wood rail
brown wood rail
Taxonomy articles created by Polbot